Mavaluy-e Olya (also Romanized as Mavālūy-e ‘Olyā; also known as Mavālū and Mavālū-ye ‘Olyā) is a village in Sarajuy-ye Sharqi Rural District, Saraju District, Maragheh County, East Azerbaijan Province, Iran. At the 2006 census, its population was 95, in 18 families.

References 

Towns and villages in Maragheh County